Alison Marie Bales (born April 4, 1985) is an American former professional basketball player of the WNBA.

High school
At the age of five, her family moved from Indianapolis, Indiana, where she was born, to the Dayton suburb of Beavercreek, Ohio; she played high school basketball for Beavercreek High School. Bales was named a WBCA All-American. She participated in the 2003 WBCA High School All-America Game, where she scored three points.

College
After her senior year, she committed to Duke University to play for the Duke Blue Devils women's basketball team. At 6' 7" she played center for Duke, and later became the all-time shot block leader at Duke and 3rd all-time in NCAA history. In the 2006 NCAA women's tournament, Bales set a Women's Tournament record by blocking 30 shots in six games (Duke lost to Atlantic Coast Conference rival Maryland in the championship game). This would stand as a record until it was broken by Baylor's Brittney Griner in 2010. Bales graduated from Duke with a double major in cultural anthropology and biology.

Duke statistics
Source

WNBA career
On her birthday, Bales was drafted No. 9 overall by the Indiana Fever in the 2007 WNBA Draft. After a season and a half with Indiana, Bales was traded to the Atlanta Dream for Kristen Mann on July 4, 2008. She would complete the season with Atlanta, and then be traded to the Phoenix Mercury on January 21, 2009 for the 18th pick in the 2009 WNBA Draft. Bales was waived by the Phoenix Mercury on June 4, 2009. After another season overseas, Bales was picked back up by the Atlanta Dream.

Over the course of her WNBA career, Bales averaged 3.8 points per game and 4.0 rebounds per game.

On April 10, 2012, Bales announced her retirement to attend medical school.

Overseas career
Bales also played for the Dynamo Moscow professional basketball club in Russia during the winter of 2007–2008. She is currently playing in the offseason for L Union Jainaut Basket Saint Amon in France.
  
She played for Turkey's Samsun during the 2008–09 off-season.

Post Basketball Career
After retiring from her basketball career, she attended Boonshoft School of Medicine, Wright State University starting in May 2013. After graduating and obtaining her MD, she attended the General Surgery Residency program at Indiana University, and will be completing her surgical fellowship in Trauma and Critical Care Surgery.

Notes

External links
 
 Dream trades Mann for Bales

1985 births
Living people
All-American college women's basketball players
American expatriate basketball people in Turkey
American women's basketball players
Atlanta Dream players
Basketball players from Ohio
Basketball players from Indianapolis
Centers (basketball)
Duke Blue Devils women's basketball players
Indiana Fever draft picks
Indiana Fever players
Parade High School All-Americans (girls' basketball)
People from Beavercreek, Ohio
21st-century American women